Leon Guwara (born 28 June 1996) is a professional footballer who plays as a left-back for SSV Jahn Regensburg. Born in Germany, he represents the Gambia national team.

Club career
Guwara joined 1. FC Köln as a child from Schwarz-Weiß Köln in 2003. He made 19 appearances for the U-19 team in the 2013–14 season of the Under 19 Bundesliga.

In April 2014, it was announced that Guwara would be joining Werder Bremen for the 2014–15 season. He made his Bundesliga debut for Werder Bremen on 5 February 2016 against Borussia Mönchengladbach.

On 31 August 2016, Guwara joined SV Darmstadt 98 on a season-long loan.

In June 2017, he joined 1. FC Kaiserslautern on loan for the 2017–18.

In May 2018, Eredivisie side FC Utrecht announced the signing of Guwara for the 2018–19. Guwara agreed a three-year contract with the club with the option of a fourth. During the winter break of the 2020–21 season, he was loaned out to league rivals VVV-Venlo for the rest of the season.

In June 2021, 2. Bundesliga side SSV Jahn Regensburg announced the transfer free signing of Guwara for the 2021–22 season. Guwara agreed a two-year contract.

International career
Guwara was born in Germany to a Gambian father and a German mother. He has represented Germany at various youth international levels. He debuted for the Gambia in a 2–0 friendly win over Niger on 5 June 2021.

Career statistics

Club

International

References

External links
 

1996 births
Living people
Footballers from Cologne
People with acquired Gambian citizenship
Gambian footballers
The Gambia international footballers
German footballers
Germany youth international footballers
Gambian people of German descent
German expatriate footballers
German expatriate sportspeople in the Netherlands
German people of Gambian descent
German sportspeople of African descent
Association football fullbacks
Bundesliga players
2. Bundesliga players
3. Liga players
Eredivisie players
SV Werder Bremen II players
SV Werder Bremen players
SV Darmstadt 98 players
1. FC Kaiserslautern players
FC Utrecht players
VVV-Venlo players
SSV Jahn Regensburg players
Gambian expatriate footballers
Gambian expatriate sportspeople in the Netherlands
Expatriate footballers in the Netherlands